Marko Maksimović  (Serbian Cyrillic: Марко Максимовић; born 20 August 1984) is a Bosnian professional football manager and former player who is the manager of Bosnian Premier League club Leotar.

Club career
Maksimović played youth football in the Džaja football school in his hometown of Banja Luka. His professional career started at another Banja Luka club - FK Borac. He is considered to have been a very creative and hard-working midfielder which secured him a place in the Bosnia and Herzegovina U21 national team.

He played for NK Zagreb and Istra 1961 in the Croatian Prva HNL.

Maksimović signed with Sarajevo in July 2007. He scored his first goal for the team against Marsaxlokk in the UEFA Champions League qualifiers on 18 July 2007. Afterwards, he played 6 months with Leotar before returning to Borac in January 2009, and retiring there three years later in 2012.

International career
Maksimović was a member of the Bosnia and Herzegovina U21 national team.

Managerial career
Maksimović started off his managerial career at BSK Banja Luka in 2015, staying there until 2017. He was then caretaker manager of Borac Banja Luka for one game in March 2018.

On 26 December 2020, Maksimović came back to Borac, this time as a permanent manager, replacing Vlado Jagodić. In his first game as manager, Borac beat Olimpik in a league match on 27 February 2021. Maksimović oversaw his first loss as manager in a league game against Velež Mostar, played on 5 March 2021. In the end however, he managed to guide Borac to a Bosnian Premier League title one game before the end of the 2020–21 season, their first after 10 years. Maksimović also almost guided the club to a 2020–21 Bosnian Cup victory, but lost to Sarajevo in the final. He resigned as Borac's manager on 28 July 2021 after a poor start to the 2021–22 season.

On 16 September 2022, Maksimović was appointed the new manager of Leotar. His first match saw Leotar draw against Sloboda Tuzla on 18 September. On 8 October 2022, he recorded his first win as the club's manager, beating Sloga Doboj 4–1 in a league game.

Managerial statistics

Honours

Player
Borac Banja Luka
Bosnian Premier League: 2010–11
Bosnian Cup: 2009–10
Republika Srpska Cup: 2008–09, 2010–11, 2011–12

Manager
Borac Banja Luka
Bosnian Premier League: 2020–21

References

External links

1984 births
Living people
Sportspeople from Banja Luka
Serbs of Bosnia and Herzegovina
Association football midfielders
Bosnia and Herzegovina footballers
Bosnia and Herzegovina under-21 international footballers
FK Borac Banja Luka players
NK Zagreb players
NK Istra 1961 players
FK Sarajevo players
FK Leotar players
Premier League of Bosnia and Herzegovina players
Croatian Football League players
Bosnia and Herzegovina expatriate footballers
Expatriate footballers in Croatia
Bosnia and Herzegovina expatriate sportspeople in Croatia
Bosnia and Herzegovina football managers
FK Borac Banja Luka managers
FK Leotar managers
Premier League of Bosnia and Herzegovina managers